Garbada is one of the 182 Legislative Assembly constituencies of Gujarat state in India. It is part of Dahod district and is reserved for candidates belonging to the Scheduled Tribes and it came into existence after the 2008 delimitation.

List of segments
This assembly seat represents the following areas:

 Garbada Taluka
 Part of Dahod Taluka, including the following villages: Moti Kharaj, Naghrala, Gadoi, Bavka, Vijagadh, Brahmkheda, Nani Kharaj, Borkheda, Lilar, Katwara, Chandwana, Kathla, Varvada, Khangela, Bhutodi, Dasla, Nani Lachheli, Moti Lachheli, Vankiya, Simaliya Khurd, Khapariya, and Agawada.
 Part of Dhanpur Taluka , including the following villages: Biliya, Kantu, Ambli Menpur, Kanakuwa, Sangasar, Zabu, Ulkadar, Rachhava, Khajuri, Harakhpur, Vakota, Kalakhunt, Navanagar, Kadval, Khadada (Na), Ambakach, Leliya Amba, Sankarpura, Nanimalu, Gohelvaga, Punakota, Kotambi, Ladva Vad, Dumka, Khalta Garabdi, Moti Malu, Vasiya Dungari, Dhanarpatiya, Gangardi Faliya, Kakad Khila, Mandor, Kanseta, Bhanpur (Kakadkhila), Bhindol, Kanjeta, Pipargota, Panam, Alindra, and Bhuvera.

Member of the Legislative Assembly
2012 - Chandrikaben Bariya, Indian National Congress

Election results

2022 
 

-->

2017

2012

See also
 List of constituencies of Gujarat Legislative Assembly
 Dahod district
 Gujarat Legislative Assembly

References

External links
 

Assembly constituencies of Gujarat
Dahod district